Browntop is a common name for several grasses and may refer to:

Agrostis capillaris, or browntop bent
Brachiaria ramosa, or browntop millet
Microstegium